Arney may refer to:

Places
Arney, a village in Northern Ireland
Arney River, a small river in County Fermanagh, Northern Ireland
Civil parish of Arney, a civil parish located in the barony of Clanawley and Tirkennedy in County Fermanagh, Northern Ireland
Arney, Indiana, an unincorporated community in eastern Jefferson Township, Owen County, in the U.S. state of Indiana

Names
Arney (surname)

See also
Arne (disambiguation)
Arnie
Arny (disambiguation)